Breakfast Point is a suburb in the Inner West of Sydney, in the state of New South Wales, Australia. Breakfast Point is located 16 kilometres west of the Sydney central business district. It is in the local government area of the City of Canada Bay. People from Breakfast Point are colloquially called Breakfastpointers.

History
The area now occupied by Breakfast Point was previously part of Mortlake. The suburb is named after a geographical headland, named "Breakfast Point", to the east of Mortlake Point and to the west of Cabarita, and the suburb name was gazetted in 1993.

According to historical records, the name of the point - and therefore the suburb name - is derived from the first contact between Europeans and the traditional owners of the land, the Wangal Clan. The encounter took place on 5 February 1788 during Captain John Hunter's exploration of the Parramatta River, while Hunter was having breakfast. William Bradley, First Lieutenant on board , recorded the following entry in the log:

We landed to cook breakfast on the opposite shore to them (Breakfast Pt.). We made signs to them to come over and waved green boughs. Soon after which 7 of them came over in 2 canoes and landed near our boats. They left their spears in the canoes and came to us. We tied beads etc. about them and left them our fire to dress their muscles which they went about as soon as our boats put off.

Hunter, who was later to become Governor of New South Wales, is also remembered in the name of the nearby suburb of Hunters Hill.

Much of the area at Breakfast Point was occupied by the Mortlake Gas Works of the Australian Gaslight Company (AGL). AGL began developing the site from 1883. The Mortlake Gasworks site offered river access for colliers—known as 'sixty milers'—to bring coal and virtually unlimited space for expansion. The gas works remained in operation until the 1990s when in 1998 AGL, after a selected tender process, selected Rosecorp Pty. Ltd. to progressively acquire and develop the Mortlake site. Redevelopment has proceeded since then.

Demographics

According to the 2016 census of population, there were 4,188 residents in Breakfast Point. 53.9% of people were born in Australia. The next most common countries of birth were China 11.0%, England 4.0% and South Korea 2.7%. The most common ancestries in Breakfast Point were English 18.0%, Chinese 15.2%, Australian 13.9%, Irish 8.0% and Italian 6.9%. 57.3% of people spoke only English at home. Other languages spoken at home included Mandarin 11.3%, Cantonese 5.0%, Korean 3.4% and Italian 3.2%. The most common responses for religion were Catholic 30.9%, No Religion 28.7% and Anglican 10.9%.

Commercial area
Breakfast Point also has a little town centre with IGA supermarket, The Olive Kitchen restaurant, Il Punto Pizzeria, two clothing shops, a hairdressers, day spa and one dental surgery at Canada Bay Dental. Further developments are planned. These developments are located opposite the historic Palace Hotel in Tennyson Road.

Housing

Breakfast Point is the location of one of the largest urban renewal projects in Sydney on a site formerly belonging to AGL. The New South Wales State Government took control of the approval process for the development from Canada Bay Council in August 2005, citing lengthy delays. Issues that arose between the council and the developer, Rosecorp, included the provision of public transport, public access to the area and its landscaping. There are several streets with architecturally designed modern houses and many modern apartment blocks in the suburb, such as Hunter's Wharf on the Parramatta River.

References

Suburbs of Sydney
City of Canada Bay